
Gmina Łysomice is a rural gmina (administrative district) in Toruń County, Kuyavian-Pomeranian Voivodeship, in north-central Poland.

Villages
Gmina Łysomice contains the villages and settlements of Chorab, Gostkowo, Julianka, Kamionki Duże, Kamionki Małe, Kowróz, Kowrózek, Lipniczki, Lulkowo, Łysomice, Ostaszewo, Papowo Toruńskie, Papowo-Osieki, Piwnice, Różankowo, Świerczynki, Świerczyny, Turzno, Tylice, Wytrębowice, Zakrzewko and Zęgwirt.

Neighbouring gminas
Gmina Łysomice is bordered by the city of Toruń and by the gminas of Chełmża, Kowalewo Pomorskie, Łubianka, Lubicz and Zławieś Wielka.

References
Polish official population figures 2006

Lysomice
Toruń County